Rajendra Kumar KC is a member of 2nd Nepalese Constituent Assembly and House of Representatives. He won Kathamandu–10 seat in 2013 Nepalese Constituent Assembly election from Nepali Congress defeating Pushpa Kamal Dahal.

In the 2022 Nepalese general election, he was elected as the member of the 2nd Federal Parliament of Nepal.

References

Nepali Congress politicians from Bagmati Province
Living people
Nepal MPs 2017–2022
Members of the 2nd Nepalese Constituent Assembly
1958 births
Nepal MPs 2022–present